Low Dietsch (i.e. Meuse-Rhenish, or ) refers to a handful of transitional Limburgish–Ripuarian dialects spoken in a number of towns and villages (e.g. Gemmenich, Hombourg, Montzen, Welkenraedt).

This area, located in the Belgian (Walloon) "tri-state area" from Voeren (Fourons), to Plombières (Bleiberg), to Eupen, is called the Low Dietsch region. Classified by German dialectologists as Ripuarian Franconian and by Dutch-language dialectologists as Southeast Limburgish, Low Dietsch refers to a transitional dialect between both languages. Low Dietsch is one of several Meuse-Rhenish varieties that makes up the north-western part of the dialect continuum known as the Rhenish fan. As the southernmost dialect of Limburgish, the Low-Dietsch speech area corresponds to the core of the old Duchy of Limburg.

French usage

In French, the term  ("Carolingian Franconian") is also used, because it is thought to be the language of the Carolingian dynasty and court, although that would be an anachronism. Low Dietsch is thought to have been spoken from Tongeren to Cologne, which would presumably make it the likeliest candidate for Charlemagne's native language. However, this expression is controversial since there is no way to prove that hypothesis. Nor is it possible that the current dialectal map was the same 1,500 years ago. Of those early documents that have survived, one, the Strasbourg Oaths (AD 842), is in Rhine Franconian, and the other, the Wachtendonck Psalms (10th century), is in a form of southern Limburgish (with a few Ripuarian Franconian traits).

In 1963 the Low Dietsch zone was incorporated to Wallonia, and since 1992 the dialect has been recognized as a "regional language" by the Walloon authority, affording it certain rights and protections. It is not, however, related to Walloon, but French is the language of officialdom in the area. It forms the northwestern border of Ripuarian Franconian and the southeastern portion of the Meuse-Rhenish area.

Southeast Limburgish
Southeast Limburgish, as spoken around Kerkrade, Bocholtz and Vaals in the Netherlands, Aachen in Germany and Raeren and Eynatten in Belgium, also shows the gradual transition from Limburgish towards Ripuarian. It is adjacent to the southeastern border of the Meuse-Rhenish language area, and is related to Southern Meuse-Rhenish. Limburgish straddles the borderline between Low Franconian and West Central German varieties. They are more-or-less mutually intelligible with the Ripuarian dialects, but show fewer 'High German shifts' (R. Hahn 2001).

Dialects belonging to the Ripuarian group almost always call themselves Platt like Öcher Platt (of Aachen) or Eischwiele Platt (of Eschweiler). The reason behind this is, that most of the far more than hundred Ripuarian dialects are bound to a village or municipality. Usually there are small distinctive differences between neighboring dialects, and increasingly bigger ones between the more distant ones. These are described by a set of isoglosses called the 'Rhenish fan' (Rheinischer Fächer in linguistics). The way someone talks, even if he is not using Ripuarian, quite often makes it possible to trace him precisely to the village or city quarter where he learned to speak.

All varieties within a half circle some 15–20 km around Aachen, including two-thirds of Dutch South Limburg and also the Low Dietsch area between Voeren and Eupen in Belgium, can be considered a group of its own, at the place where the Netherlands, Belgium, and Germany meet. This variety still possesses interesting syntactic idiosyncrasies, probably dating from the period when the old Duchy of Limburg existed.

Classification
 Indo-European
 Germanic
 West Germanic
 Low Franconian / West Central German
 East Low Franconian / Middle Franconian
 Limburgish–Ripuarian, Low Dietsch /

See also
 Southeast Limburgish dialect
 Ripuarian language
 Thiois in the French Wikipedia 
 Eupen-Malmedy

References

External links
 Belgian Tri-state Area: Trois frontières.
 Projet babel's forum, thread Franciques parlés en Belgique
 Notre patois, notre "Platdutch"

Dutch dialects
Low Franconian languages
German dialects
Languages of Belgium
Ripuarian language
Limburg (region)